David Kennedy (10 July 1890 – 1 July 1916) was a Scottish first-class cricketer and soldier. He was a right-handed batsman and wicketkeeper.

Life and career
Kennedy was born in July 1890 in Uddingston. Educated at Uddingston Grammar School and Jordanhill Teacher Training College, he became a schoolteacher at Townhead School after graduating from the latter.

Kennedy appeared once in first-class cricket representing Scotland against Ireland at the Observatory Lane on 16 July 1914. He played poorly, scoring 11 runs and being dismissed both innings. At the outbreak of the First World War in August 1914, Kennedy enlisted in the Glasgow Commercials of the Highland Light Infantry and soon rose to the rank of sergeant. Shortly afterwards sent to the frontline in France, he was killed on 1 July 1916 at the Leipzig Salient on the first day on the Somme. He was buried at Lonsdale Cemetery, Authuille.

References

Citations

Sources
 

1890 births
1916 deaths
Sportspeople from South Lanarkshire
Scottish cricketers
People educated at Uddingston Grammar School
Scottish schoolteachers
British Army personnel of World War I
Highland Light Infantry soldiers
British military personnel killed in the Battle of the Somme
Military personnel from Lanarkshire